Esther Victoria Abraham (30 December 1916 – 6 August 2006), better known by her stage name Pramila, was an Indian model, actress and first woman film producer in the Hindi film industry. She is also well known for winning the first Miss India pageant in 1947.

Personal life
Pramila was born in 1916 in Calcutta (now Kolkata) to a Baghdadi Jewish family. She was the daughter of Reuben Abraham, a Jewish businessman from Kolkata, by his second wife Matilda Isaac, a Jewish lady from Karachi. Pramila had three older half-siblings from her father's first marriage to a certain Leah, and six (or five) siblings from her own parents' marriage.

Pramila was married twice. At the age of seventeen, she married Maniklal Dangi, a Hindu Marwadi gentleman. The marriage lasted less than one year, but it produced a son. In 1939, aged 22, Pramila married again, becoming the second wife of her second husband. This was the small-time actor Syed Hasan Ali Zaidi, a practicing Shia Muslim whose stage name was "Kumar." Among Zaidi's more noticeable roles was that of the sculptor in Mughal-e-Azam. Pramila had to abandon Judaism and convert to Islam in order to marry Zaidi, and this happened when anti-semitism was at its height in Europe. Pramila and Zaidi had four children together. In 1963, shortly after the release of Mughal-i-Azam, Zaidi chose to leave Pramila and her children and move to Pakistan. Pramila remained in India, where she acted in some more films, and also produced a few films.

Pramila's youngest son, Haidar Ali, has pursued a career in films and television. He acted in the TV serial Nukkad and more recently, the song Khwaja Mere Khwaja in the film Jodhaa Akbar (2008) was picturized with him playing the main singer. Pramila's daughter Naqi Jahan was crowned Eve's Weekly Miss India in 1967, making them the only mother-daughter pair to have won the Miss India title. Naqi Jehan also represented India at the Queen of the Pacific Quest beauty pageant in Australia.

Esther Victoria Abraham, better known as Pramila, died on 6 August 2006 aged nearly 90.

Career
Pramila was the winner of the first Miss India pageant, in 1947 and at the age of 31. Her first job in the entertainment industry was as a dancer for a Parsi theatre company, dancing during the 15 minutes pause while the reel projector was changed. Pramila acted as a fearless stunt star in 30 films, including Ulti Ganga, Bijli, Basant (film) and Jungle King. She also became the first major woman film producer in India, with 16 films under her banner Silver Productions. Morarji Desai, the then Chief Minister of Bombay, had her were arrested because she was suspected of spying for Pakistan, due to her constant travels to that country. However, it was later proven that she travelled to promote her films.

Besides her career in film, she was also a graduate of the University of Cambridge, and became a teacher. She also designed her own film costumes and jewelry.

Filmography
 Return of the Toofan Mail, directed by R.S. Chaudhary (1935)
 Bhikaran, directed by P.K. Atharti (1935)
 Mahamaya, directed by Gunjal (1936)
 Hamari Betiya / Our Darling Daughters, directed by R.S. Chaudhary (1936)
 Saria, directed by Shanti Dave (1936)
 Mere Lai, directed by Gunjal (1937)
 Mother India, directed by Gunjal (1938)
 Bijlee, directed by Balwant Bhatt (1939)
 Hukum Ka Ekka, directed by Shanti Dave (1939)
 Jungle King, directed by Nari Ghadialli (1939)
 Kahan Hai Manzil Ten, directed by S.M. Yussuf (1939)
 Sardar, directed by Dwarka Khosla (1940)
 Kanchan, directed by Leela Chitnis (1941)
 Shahzaadi, directed by J.P. Advani (1941)
 Basant, directed by Amiya Chakrabarty (1942)
 Jhankar, directed by S. Khalil (1942)
 Saheli, directed by S.M. Yussuf (1942)
 Ulti Ganga, directed by K. Dhaiber (1942)
 Bade Nawab Saheb, directed by B.D. Vedi (1944)
 Naseeb, directed by B.D. Vedi (1945)
 Devar, directed by S.M. Yussuf (1946)
 Nehle Pe Dehla, directed by S.M. Yussuf (1946)
 Sal Gira, directed by K.S. Dariani (1946)
 Shalimar, directed by Roop K. Shorey (1946)
 Doosri Shaadi, directed by Ram Dariani (1947)
 Aap Beeti, directed by M. Kumar (1948)
 Beqasoor, directed by K. Amamath (1950)
 Hamari Beti, directed by Shobhna Samarth (1950)
 Dhoon, directed by M. Kumar (1953)
 Majboori / Choti Bahen, directed by Ram Dariani (1954)
 Badal Aur Bijlee, directed by Maurice Abraham (1956)
 Fighting Queen, directed by Nari Ghadiali (1956)
 Jungle King, directed by Masud (1959)
 Bahana, directed by M. Kumar (1960)
 Murad, directed by Nari Ghadiali (1961)
 Quest, directed by Amol Palekar (2006)

References

External links

 Meet the Jewish Beauty Queens of India

Indian beauty pageant winners
Indian Jews
Indian people of Iraqi-Jewish descent
2006 deaths
1916 births
Female models from Kolkata
Indian women film producers
Hindi film producers
20th-century Indian businesspeople
20th-century Indian actresses
Film producers from Kolkata
Actresses in Hindi cinema
Indian film actresses
Indian stunt performers
Women stunt performers
Indian costume designers
20th-century Indian designers
Women artists from West Bengal
Businesswomen from West Bengal
20th-century Indian businesswomen
Baghdadi Jews